Nadellaa (Dhivehi: ނަޑެއްލާ) is one of the inhabited islands of Gaafu Dhaalu Atoll.

Geography

Demography

References

Islands of the Maldives